David Roy Simmons  (6 September 1930 – 30 November 2015), also known as Rawiri Te Puru Terehou, was a New Zealand ethnologist, historian and author.

Biography

Born in 1930, Simmons studied at Victoria University College and the University of Auckland, graduating from the latter with a Master of Arts with honours. From 1962 to 1968 he was the keeper in anthropology at Otago Museum in Dunedin. He was appointed as the ethologist at the Auckland Institute and Museum in 1968, and became the assistant director of Auckland War Memorial Museum in 1978.

He wrote many books relating to Māori art, culture and history, including: 
 The Maori Hei-tiki (1966) with Henry Devenish Skinner 
 The Great New Zealand Myth (1976)
 Tā Moko (1986)
 Whakairo (1994)

He is credited with effectively demolishing Percy Smith's "great fleet" hypothesis.

He also edited:
 J.D.H. Buchanan's The Māori History and Place Names of Hawke's Bay (1973)
 George Graham's Maori Place Names of Auckland (first published 1980).

In the 1985 Queen's Birthday Honours, Simmons was appointed a Member of the Order of the British Empire, for services to ethnology and the Māori people, and in 2013 he was awarded the Auckland Museum Medal and appointed an associate emeritus of Auckland War Memorial Museum.

Simmons died on 30 November 2015.

References

External links

1930 births
2015 deaths
Victoria University of Wellington alumni
University of Auckland alumni
New Zealand ethnologists
20th-century New Zealand historians
New Zealand Members of the Order of the British Empire
Writers from Auckland
20th-century New Zealand male writers
People associated with the Auckland War Memorial Museum